The War Memorials (Local Authorities' Powers) Act 1923 (13 & 14 Geo. V c. 18) was an Act of Parliament in the United Kingdom. It received Royal Assent on 18 July 1923.

It extended throughout the United Kingdom, and empowered county, borough, district and parish councils ("local authorities") to incur expenditure on constructing and maintaining a war memorial within the area for which they were responsible. Expenditure was to be covered by levying a rate which was not to exceed 1⅓ of a penny in the pound for any given financial year (0.5%); parish councils were required to have this rate approved by the county council.

The Act has been modernised in line with administrative reorganisations, but is still in force.

References

United Kingdom Acts of Parliament 1923
British military memorials and cemeteries